

Heinrich Paul Hermann Voigtsberger (10 February 1903 – 17 March 1959) was a German general (Generalmajor) in the Wehrmacht during World War II. He was a recipient of the Knight's Cross of the Iron Cross with Oak Leaves of Nazi Germany.  Voigtsberger surrendered to the British forces in May 1945 and was released in 1947.

Awards and decorations
 Iron Cross (1939) 2nd Class (20 February 1940) & 1st Class (21 April 1941)

 Knight's Cross of the Iron Cross with Oak Leaves
 Knight's Cross on 9 July 1941 as Major and commander of MG-Bataillon 2
 351st Oak Leaves on 9 December 1943 as Oberst and commander of Grenadier-Regiment 60 (mot.)

References

Citations

Bibliography

 
 

1903 births
1959 deaths
People from Gera
People from the Principality of Reuss-Gera
Major generals of the German Army (Wehrmacht)
Recipients of the Knight's Cross of the Iron Cross with Oak Leaves
German prisoners of war in World War II held by the United Kingdom
Military personnel from Thuringia
German Army officers of World War II